Kumander Bawang: Kalaban ng Mga Aswang, or simply Kumander Bawang, is a 1988 Filipino fantasy comedy film directed by Ramje and starring Herbert Bautista as the titular character, alongside Mat Ranillo III, Matet, Mia Prats, Timmy Cruz, Jigo Garcia, Jay Jay Salvador, Vina Morales, Joko Diaz, and Ronald Jayme. Produced by Viva Films, the film was released in theaters on September 29, 1988. Critic Lav Diaz gave Kumander Bawang a negative review, criticizing the film's stale and cliché comedy.

Bautista later reprised the role of Kumander Bawang in the 2006 fantaserye Super Inggo. He has a son named Boy Bawang in Super Inggo.

Plot
Tikboy is a moro-moro performer who wanders into the woods to take a dump during a performance. After being waylaid by numerous creatures, he meets a hermit who tells him of his destiny as the latest incarnation of Kumander Bawang, a superhero who fights aswangs led by Conde Regalado, who has risen after decades of slumber to wreak havoc on the living. To do so, he retrieves the necklace that activates Kumander Bawang's powers from a half-aswang girl, then proceeds to kill Regalado and the aswangs by hurling explosive garlic at them, while Tikboy's grandfather, Lolo Ambo, incites the townspeople to burn down the Regalado mansion.

Cast
Herbert Bautista as Tikboy / Kumander Bawang
Mat Ranillo III as Conde Regalado
Matet as Luningning
Mia Prats as Liwayway
Timmy Cruz as Carmen
Jigo Garcia as Odie
Jay Jay Salvador as Ernesto
Vina Morales as Vinia
Joko Diaz as Kiko
Ronald Jayme as Nestor
Melissa Perez Rubio
Berting Labra as Lolo Ambo
Lito Anzurez
Bebong Osorio
Dick Israel
Balot
Jenny Francisco
Paulo Delgado
Byron Lozano

Music
The music of Kumander Bawang and the music of Buy One, Take One were released together by Viva Records in one album titled Kumander Bawang: Kalaban ng Aswang/Buy One, Take One: Viva Films Original Movie Soundtrack.

Critical response
Lav Diaz, writing for the Manila Standard, gave a negative review of the film for its cliché and stale comedy, noting that it is due to it being geared towards children. He commended, however, the engaging plotline involving Berting Labra's grandfather character struggling to keep the moro-moro stage tradition alive.

References

External links

1988 films
1980s fantasy comedy films
1988 comedy films
Filipino-language films
Philippine superhero films
Philippine fantasy comedy films
Supernatural comedy films
Viva Films films
1980s superhero films